Aakhri Mujra is a 1981 Bollywood film directed by Hiren Nag and starring Asha Parekh, Zarina Wahab, Nadira, Ajit, Jagdeep, Shreeram Lagoo and Vikram.

Cast 
 Asha Parekh as Shamshaad
 Vikram Makandar  as Gulzar
 Zarina Wahab as Sitara
 Ajit Khan
 Jagdeep
 Nadira as Panna Baai
 Shreeram Lagoo as Anand Narayan
 Mukri

Soundtrack

References

External links
 

1981 films
1980s Hindi-language films
Films scored by Kalyanji Anandji